This is a list of the busiest airports in Germany.

In graph

2022

2021

2020

2019

2018

2017

2016

2015

2014

2013

2012

2011

2010

See also
List of airports in Germany

References

Germany